Banks & Wag are composers based in London.

Chris Banks and Wag Marshall-Page studied Commercial Music together at the University of Westminster (1996-1999). After graduation, Chris studied Composition For Screen at the Royal College of Music (1999-2000), continuing to perform with Wag as members of indie band Nnook. The group disbanded in 1999, and the pair went on to work with pop acts including McFly, Sugababes, Busted, Blue, and Sophie Ellis-Bextor; and Wag joined Infadels as bassist.

As composers, they have written for The X Factor, ZingZillas, Year Dot, Strictly Dance Fever, The National Lottery Awards, Ross Noble, Dead Ringers, and Spain's Tele Madrid News, winning a Silver Broadcast Design Award for Best News Theme.

Their title song for How To Start Your Own Country was described as "brilliant" by the Radio Times, "dangerously catchy" by Bella Online, and "worthy of Top of the Pops" by the Daily Mirror. The series went on to win two BAFTAs and spawned an iTunes #1 single in 2005.

Banks was also behind the CBeebies series Space Pirates, whose theme tune topped the iTunes Children's Chart for 11 weeks in 2007–2008.

In 2010, they wrote and produced all the music for the CBeebies series, ZingZillas. On 30 August 2010, the series' first single "Do You Didgeridoo?" was released, reaching #1 in the iTunes Children's Chart.

Compositions
Banks and Wag have composed music for the following television programmes:
 Amazing Greys
 Awkward Situations For Men
 Blue Peter
 Busted: A Ticket For Everyone
 Danny Wallace's How To Start Your Own Country
 Dave Gorman's Important Astrology Experiment
 Gastronuts
 Go Jetters
 ITV Sport
 Lip Service
 Littlest Pet Shop: A World of Our Own
 National Lottery Awards
 Ross Noble's Australian Trip
 Ross Noble: Nobleism
 Ross Noble: Randomist
 Ross Noble: Unrealtime
 Something Special
 Sorry, I've Got No Head
 Strictly African Dancing
 Strictly Dance Fever
 Stick to What You Know
 Walk On The Wild Side
 The X Factor
 Year Dot
 ZingZillas

Banks only
 Happy Birthday Brucie!
 Nuzzle and Scratch
 Space Pirates

External links
Official Facebook Page
Banks & Wag Official Site
Chris Banks Official Site
ZingZillas Press Release

English composers
English television composers